Pure is a British television series first broadcast on 30 January 2019 on Channel 4. Based on the book of the same name by Rose Cartwright, it stars Charly Clive as 24-year-old Marnie, who suffers from obsessive-compulsive disorder and is plagued by disturbing sexual thoughts. On 14 February 2020 it was announced that the series would not be renewed for a second series.

Cast
 Charly Clive as Marnie
 Joe Cole as Charlie
 Kiran Sonia Sawar as Shereen  
 Niamh Algar as Amber
 Anthony Welsh as Joe
 Doon Mackichan as Sarah
 Jing Lusi as Sef
 Tori Allen-Martin as Libby
 Samuel Edward-Cooke as Sam
 Olive Gray as Helen
 Jacob Collins-Levy as Benji

Broadcast
The series was first broadcast in the UK on Channel 4 from January to March 2019. It was not renewed for a second season. In the United States, the series was released on HBO Max on 27 August 2020 and was removed on 26 August 2022. In Italy, the TV series was published entirely on the RaiPlay streaming platform starting from 25 November 2020

Reception
Pure received generally positive reviews and was praised for its frank treatment of mental health issues and sexuality. It was described as "a masterly comedy about sex and mental health" by the Guardian. The NME gave the show 4/5 and described it as "an essential comedy that peels away the stigma of mental health", and described it as "one of 2019's standout shows so far". The Daily Telegraph called the show "an excruciating success".

On review aggregator Rotten Tomatoes, the series holds an approval rating of 80% based on 20 reviews. The website's critical consensus reads, "Pure compassionately explore(s) the complications of compulsion, shame, and struggling to make sense of oneself."

References

External links
 
 Pure on the Channel 4 website

2019 British television series debuts
2019 British television series endings
Obsessive–compulsive disorder in fiction
Casual sex in television
English-language television shows
Channel 4 comedy
2010s British comedy television series